The Mercury 18, sometimes just referred to as a Mercury,  is an American sailboat that was designed by Ernest Nunes as a one design racer and first built in 1939. The boat was one of the first one-design sailboat classes designed for plywood construction.

The design is sometimes confused with the unrelated Sparkman & Stephens 1940 Cape Cod Mercury design.

Production
The design was built in the United States by Ernest Nunes, W. D. Schock Corp originally in Corona, California and later in Santa Ana, California and Moore Sailboats in Watsonville, California. By 1994 a total of 1,060 boats had been completed, but it is now out of production.

W. D. Schock Corp records indicate that they built 21 boats between 1963 and 1967.

At one point plans and also unfinished fiberglass hulls were available for amateur construction.

Design
The Mercury 18 is a recreational keelboat, originally built predominantly of plywood and, starting in 1952, from fiberglass with wood trim. It has a fractional sloop rig with wooden or aluminum spars. The single chined hull has a spooned raked stem, a raised counter transom, a keel-hung rudder controlled by a tiller and a fixed long keel. It displaces  and carries  of lead ballast built into the keel.

For sailing the design is equipped with two jumper stays, the topmost or which is angled forward, plus a backstay. Flotation is not required by the class rules, but Personal flotation devices, bilge pumps and additional safety equipment is required to be carried for racing.

The design is normally raced with a crew of two sailors.

Operational history
The design is supported by an active US west coast type club, the Mercury Class, that organizes racing.

In a 1994 review Richard Sherwood wrote, "this classic-design, full-keel sloop is usually found in the
[United States] Northeast or on the West Coast."

See also
List of sailing boat types

Similar sailboats
Buccaneer 200
Catalina 18
COM-PAC 19
Com-Pac Sunday Cat
Cornish Shrimper 19
Drascombe Lugger
Hunter 19-1
Hunter 19 (Europa)
Naiad 18
Nordica 16
Sanibel 18
Sandpiper 565
Siren 17
Typhoon 18
West Wight Potter 19

References

Keelboats
1930s sailboat type designs
Sailing yachts
Two-person sailboats
Sailboat type designs by Ernest Nunes
Sailboat types built by W. D. Schock Corp
Sailboat types built by Moore Sailboats